The 1989 Virginia lieutenant gubernatorial election was held on November 7, 1989. Democratic nominee Don Beyer defeated Republican nominee Edwina P. Dalton with 54.14% of the vote.

General election

Candidates
Don Beyer, Democratic, Businessman
Edwina P. Dalton, Republican, State Senator

Results

References

Virginia
1989
Lieutenant